Aphalarini is a tribe of jumping plant lice (psyllid) in the subfamily Aphalarinae, first described by Franz Löw in 1879.

I.D. Hodkinson (1989) includes the genera, Aphalara and Craspedolepta in the tribe, whereas D.L. Crawford (1914) includes Aphalara and Rhinocola.

Further reading

References 

Aphalaridae
Hemiptera tribes